Cledford Bridge Halt railway station was located in Middlewich, Cheshire, England. The station was opened by the London and North Western Railway on 2 January 1911, the station closed on 2 March 1942. The platform was situated on an embankment on the south side of Cledford Lane over-bridge and was accessed by steps from the lane.

References

Disused railway stations in Cheshire
Railway stations in Great Britain opened in 1911
Railway stations in Great Britain closed in 1942
Former London and North Western Railway stations